Limitless may refer to:

Arts and entertainment
 Limitless (book), the republished title of the novel The Dark Fields
 Limitless (film), a 2011 film based on the book
 Limitless (TV series), a 2015 American television series based on the film
 "Limitless", a sculpture by Avtarjeet Singh Dhanjal

Music

Albums
 Limitless (Crown the Empire EP), 2011
 Limitless (NCT 127 EP), 2017
 Limitless (Planetshakers album), 2013
 Limitless (Temperance album), 2015 (or its title song)
 Limitless (Tonight Alive album), 2016
 Limitless (The Piano Guys album), 2018
 Limitless, a 2020 album by Richard Marx

Songs
 "Limitless (Burns song)", a 2013 song performed by British record producer Burns
 "Limitless (Megan Washington song)", a 2014 single by Megan Washington
 "Limitless (Jennifer Lopez song)", a 2018 song performed by American singer Jennifer Lopez
 "Limitless", a 2012 song by French singer Nolwenn Leroy on her album Ô Filles de l'eau
 "Limitless", a 2020 song by American band Bon Jovi on their album Bon Jovi: 2020
 "Limitless", a 2017 song by Korean band NCT 127 from the album of the same name

People
 Wiktor Malinowski (born 1994), Polish professional poker player who plays online under the alias "limitless"

Transportation
 Limitless (luxury yacht), one of the world's largest private superyachts
 Limitless Airways, a charter airline based in Croatia

See also
 Aditi, Sanskrit for "not (a) bound (diti)" or without limits
 Ein Sof, Hebrew for "unending" or without limits
 Limit (disambiguation)
 Limited (disambiguation)
 Unlimited (disambiguation)